Marjorie Joyce "Billie" Fulford (21 August 1914 – 28 May 1987) was a New Zealand cricketer who played primarily as a right-arm off break bowler. She appeared in one Test match for New Zealand in 1948, against Australia, in which she took 2/46 from 14 overs. She played domestic cricket for Wellington.

References

External links
 
 

1914 births
1987 deaths
Cricketers from Wellington City
New Zealand women cricketers
New Zealand women Test cricketers
Wellington Blaze cricketers